Brad Gibson is an Australian-Canadian astrophysicist. He is the Head of the Department of Physics & Mathematics, and Director of the E.A. Milne Centre for Astrophysics, at the University of Hull. He is known for identifying the regions of the Galaxy most likely to harbor complex biological life, designing and constructing the first operational liquid mirror telescope observatory, and using supernovae as cosmological probes, the latter for which led to the 2009 Gruber Prize in Cosmology. A passionate advocate for Widening Participation, Gibson delivers more than 100 presentations annually to schools and the general public; his Changing Face of Physics campaign has been highlighted as Good Practice by the UK Equality Challenge Unit.

Early life and education
Gibson was born in Toronto, Canada and raised in Ajax, Ontario and Mississauga, Ontario, where he latterly attended Port Credit Secondary School. He earned a BSc Degree with Honors in Physics from the University of Waterloo (1988), before pursuing an MSc in Astronomical Instrumentation (1990) and PhD Degree in Theoretical Astrophysics (1995) at the University of British Columbia. His postgraduate research demonstrated the viability of rotating liquid mirrors for astronomical imaging and was awarded a SPIE Scholarship for its Outstanding Long-Range Contributions to Optical Sciences.

Career
In 1995, Gibson was awarded an NSERC Research Fellowship which he held for three years at the Australian National University. Following his research fellowship, Gibson joined the University of Colorado as a Research Associate, before joining Swinburne University of Technology as a professor of astrophysics in 2000; during his tenure at Swinburne, Gibson also served as deputy director to the newly formed Centre for Astrophysics and Supercomputing, and Deputy Head for the School of Biological Sciences and Electrical Engineering. In 2006, Gibson was appointed chair in Theoretical Astrophysics at the University of Central Lancashire. Gibson joined the University of Hull in 2015, where he was responsible for the establishment of the E.A. Milne Centre for Astrophysics and, since 2017, has served as the Head of the Department of Physics and Mathematics.

Gibson served as a member of United Kingdom's Research Excellence Framework 2021 Physics Sub-Panel, the Joint Institute for Nuclear Astrophysics Advisory Panel, a Trustee for the Spacelink Learning Foundation, and vice-president of the Astronomical Society of Australia. He sits on the advisory board of YobiMinds Ltd., the Royal Society University Research Fellowship Panel, the Institute of Physics Heads of Department Steering Group, and the Scientific Editorial Board for The Astrophysical Journal.

Research
Gibson and Paul Hickson designed and constructed the world's first operational Liquid Mirror Telescope Observatory, in Vancouver, Canada. His PhD involved the development of software tools to aid in mapping the distribution of the chemical elements throughout the Universe. With those tools, Gibson's team was able to define the Galactic Habitable Zone, the regions of our Milky Way Galaxy most likely to harbour complex biological life, research that was named by the readers of National Geographic Magazine as one of the Top 10 News Stories of the Year and led to a TEDx talk on the topic of alien life. As an NSERC Research Fellow at the Australian National University, Gibson led the Hubble Space Telescope Key Project on the Extragalactic Distance Scale in its use of exploding stars – supernovae – to determine the expansion rate of the Universe, research which led to the award of the 2009 Gruber Prize in Cosmology. Gibson was also responsible for leading the HI Parkes All-Sky Survey working group tasked with characterizing the mysterious high-velocity gas clouds which surround the Milky Way Galaxy; he and his PhD student, Mary Putman, provided the first evidence that strong gravitational forces were disrupting our closest neighbouring galaxies. As a Galactic Archaeologist, Gibson's team was responsible for developing the primary paradigm which describes the emergence of thick stellar disks within a cosmological framework, and subsequently saw Gibson elected a Builder of the Radial Velocity Experiment. Most recently, Gibson has taken on Co-Primary Investigator status (with Changbom Park) for Horizon Run 5, an ambitious cosmological simulation of the Universe.

Science advocacy
Gibson is an active schools and public outreach ambassador, delivering 100+ events and presentations annually. His efforts include several events, including appearances at the Royal Institution of Great Britain, the Cheltenham Science Festival, European AstroFest (opening for Brian Cox and Lucy Hawking), the British Science Festival, a TEDx talk on the search for alien life, and a monthly radio spot on BBC Radio Humberside. His efforts though are focused more on Widening Participation across socio-economic boundaries, with the majority of his 100+ annual events aimed at schools situated within areas of monetary deprivation. Since 2015, he has run more than 1000 events, reaching more than 30,000 people in-person, including 15,000+ students across 70 different schools. His efforts led to him being named the Institute of Physics John Porter Memorial Lecturer, the Leon Davis Lecturers (Glasgow), the Ray Bootland Memorial Lecturers (Hampshire), and the Bexwyke Lecturer (Manchester).

Gibson's contributions to Science Advocacy and Research led to his election to Fellow of the Institute of Physics in 2021.

Awards and honors
1988 - G.A. Bakos Award, University of Waterloo
1990 - SPIE Scholarship in Optical Engineering, The International Society for Optical Engineering (SPIE)
1995 – NSERC Research Fellowship
2003 - Research Excellence Award, Swinburne University
2004 - Top 10 News Story of the year, National Geographic
2012 – The Kevin Westfold Distinguished Visitor, Monash University
2015 - The John Porter Memorial Lecture, Institute of Physics 
2018 - Outstanding Research Group - Science and Engineering, University of Hull 
2018 - Athena Swan Bronze Award, AdvanceHE
2019 - The Bexwyke Lecture, Manchester Grammar School
2019 - The Leon Davies Lecture, Astronomical Society of Glasgow
2019 - The Ray Bootland Memorial Lecture - Hampshire Astronomical Group
2019 - Outstanding Contributions to Outreach, University of Hull 
2021 - Elected Fellow of the Institute of Physics

Bibliography

Books
The Third Stromlo Symposium: The Galactic Halo (1999) ISBN 978-1886733862
Stromlo Workshop on High-Velocity Clouds (1999) 978-1886733879
The 5th Workshop on Galactic Chemodyamics (2004)
Workshop on Numerical Modeling in MHD and Plasma Physics (2018)
Second Workshop on Numerical Modeling in MHD and Plasma Physics (2019)
Third Workshop on Numerical Modeling in MHD and Plasma Physics (2020)

Selected articles
Putman, M.E., Gibson, B.K, et al. (1998), Tidal Disruption of the Magellanic Clouds by the Milky Way, Nature, 394, 752
Freedman, W.L., Madore, B.F., Gibson, B.K., et al. (2001). Final Results from the Hubble Space Telescope Key Project to Measure the Hubble Constant. The Astrophysical Journal, 553, 47
Lineweaver, C.H., Fenner, Y., Gibson, B.K. (2004). The Galactic Habitable Zone and the Age Distribution of Complex Life in the Milky Way, Science, 303, 59
Brook, C.B., Kawata, D., Gibson, B.K., Freeman, K.C. (2004). The Emergence of the Thick Disk in a Cold Dark Matter Universe, The Astrophysical Journal, 612, 894
Pilkington, K., Few, C.G., Gibson, B.K., et al. (2012). Metallicity Gradients in Disks. Do Galaxies Form Inside-Out?, Astronomy & Astrophysics, 540, A56

References 

Living people
Year of birth missing (living people)
Canadian astrophysicists
Australian astrophysicists
University of Waterloo alumni
University of British Columbia alumni
Academic staff of Swinburne University of Technology
Academics of the University of Central Lancashire
Academics of the University of Hull
Science communicators
Fellows_of_the_Institute_of_Physics